Edward How may refer to:
 Edward How (military officer) (c. 1702–1750), British officer, diplomat and member of the Nova Scotia Council
 Edward How (priest), Anglican archdeacon in Ireland 
 Edward How (cricketer) (1974–2012), English cricketer, banker and educator